The Africa Channel is a cable and streaming channel focusing on travel, lifestyle, and culture documentaries. The channel covers the lands, people, culture, and history of Africa. Co-founded by Zimbabwean James Makawa, the Africa Channel launched in the United States in September 2005.

The Africa Channel is broadcast in the United States through Comcast, Charter Communications, Cox Communications and also available in Jamaica, the Bahamas, Trinidad & Tobago, St. Lucia, Barbados, Bermuda, Grenada and other islands throughout the Caribbean.

The channel launched in high definition on August 1, 2010.

The Africa Channel is an associate member of the Caribbean Cable Cooperative and is distinct from the international version of The Africa Channel which launched in September 2007.
The African Channel is a showcase for English language television series, specials, documentaries, feature films, music, soaps, biographies, current business analysis, cultural and historical programs.

Programs
Africa on a Plate, follow a chef as he tours Africa's cuisines
African Masters, about the arts
House of Tayo about a Rwandan fashion designer
 Jabu's Jungle

See also
The Africa Channel International

References

External links

Television networks in the United States
Television channels and stations established in 2005
African-American television
2005 establishments in the United States
African-American television networks